Matko Šašek, also known as Koolade is a Croatian hip-hop, electronic, and urban music producer. Born in Zagreb in the late 1970s, he began his music career in the late 1990s. Along with other members of the Blackout family he played a major role in establishing hip-hop genre in the Croatian and regional (Balkans) music scene, rocking charts, record sales and winning a few national music awards (local equivalent to the Grammys) in Croatia and Bosnia.

Later he and his partner/manager Phat Phillie realized that his production would make a good export, and continued to expand his work throughout Europe and the U.S., where he is perhaps best known for his production work on Masta Ace's "Beautiful" on the album A Long Hot Summer, as well as a number of other prominent American hip-hop artists such as Ghostface Killah and Masta Killa of the Wu Tang Clan, Sean Price, Xzibit, Sadat X, Styles P, Diamond D, Das EFX, Peedi Crakk, Tony Touch, Rah Digga, Too Short, Bow Wow, and others. Koolade is locally and regionally known for his collaborations with the Croatian hip-hop groups Tram 11 and Bolesna Braća, as well as Bosnian rappers Edo Maajka and Frenkie.

Early years

Born on 1 June 1978 in Zagreb, Croatia, he showed great interest in music from his early days. Growing up in the 1980s he listened to artists like Queen (being a fan since age of 6), Michael Jackson, U2, Depeche Mode, New Order, Human League, Dire Straits etc. In 5th and 6th grade he took piano lessons, but quit after two years due to a lack of interest in classical music education. He did not play the piano again, until the start of his professional music career in the mid/late 1990s.

Hip Hop

In the years 1989/1990 his sister introduces him to Hip Hop music which he initially hates, but after a year or so, Hip Hop music becomes his obsession. Artists like Run-DMC, Public Enemy, N.W.A., Ice Cube, EPMD would very soon take over his tape deck. Due to a few shows like MTV's Yo! MTV Raps, Rap Attack, and his future manager Phat Philly's own Blackout Rap Show on Radio 101, he keeps track of the international scene and all the fresh new releases. Soon enough he starts forming his first high school demo bands of pretty much no significance like G-Style and Ill Behavior. Having interest in both rapping and beatmaking he makes his first tracks. Although those would end up being just tries and attempts, but a good practice for his later work.

Blackout

As Hip Hop scene would start resonating more and more with the local kids in Croatia during the early/mid 1990s he starts hangin around clubs and people playing, promoting and making Hip Hop music. Hearing the local artist's demos being played on Blackout Rap Show, he wasn't overwhelmed with the production on those, and decides he wants to contribute to the scene with his musical talent as a beat-maker and producer. Eventually he focuses on beat-making and production, and gets embraced by the local scene very quickly, due to the quality of his material. Very soon he becomes a member of the Blackout Project, the DJ's, MC's and beat-makers revolving and evolving around the Blackout Rap Show. In 1998, his 1st production credit release, which marked the start of his professional career, were two tracks by Tram 11 "Des Mozges" & "Kog je briga za vas", on Blackout Project's "Project Impossible" album. He collaborates with many soon to be renowned local and regional hip hop artists like Tram 11, Sick Rhyme Sayazz aka Bolesna Braća, El Bahattee, Nered & Stoka, Edo Maajka, Frenkie, Shorty, Elemental etc... Meaning, they all make history together, rockin the charts and sales on a mainstream level. In the following years, he gains respect not just in the hip hop scene, but throughout the local, regional, and European urban music scene. In the Balkans region he enjoys a legendary status. He and his manager Phat Phillie continue to work up to date, having a strong bond as partners in crime, and continue shopping and delivering the world music scene with some of that Koolade, placing his music worldwide. He produced "Beautiful" by Masta Ace.

Media & marketing

Being a music producer and sound engineer, Koolade does and scores quite a few commercials, locally and worldwide, and copyrights his music in the world of media, TV and marketing. Some of the references are H&M, Nivea, Alizee, EA Sports, Y2K, and TV shows like So You Think You Can Dance & Ugly Betty etc.

Recent Days 

Today Koolade continues to produce for other acts as he always used to. One of the recent ones he is affiliated with would be Kandžija, High5, Geralt iz Rivije, Frenkie, Kontra, and the whole of Zagreb's and regional underground scene.

His 2016 single "Say Nothing" featured Rah Digga, Sean Price, and Tony Touch, and was released on Duck Down Music.

Koolade also has a stream of instrumental EP's, singels and albums, genre wise ranging from beats, alternative hip-hop, electronic beats to future funk. Since 2016, he's been affiliated with a US label Blvnt Records. His music got picked up and played by many international podcasts and radio shows such as Soulection, Voyage Funktastique and WeFunk.

He also performs his music live, which includes live sampling, fx tweaking, playing bass lines, leads and talkbox.

Awards and recognition

In 2007, Los Angeles-based URB magazine named Koolade one of the top 100 best up-and-coming urban artists, along with artists like M.I.A. and Block Party.

Discography

Croatian & regional production credits

Project Impossible (Blackout Project album, Radio 101 1997), produced songs: "Intro", "Des Mozges" feat.Tram 11, "Kog je briga za vas" feat.Tram 11
Čovječe Ne Ljuti Se (Tram 11 album, Menart Records 1999), produced songs: "Čovječe Ne Ljuti Se", "Znaš Ko Sam", "Kaj Ima Lima?", "Udri Brigu Na Veselje", "Za Sve Oko Mene", "Nema Škvadre" (featuring Major League Figures), "Mokri Snovi (Remix)", "Lažni Frajeri", "Lančana Reakcija" and "Mikrofon Provjeravam"
Lovci na šubare (Bolesna Braća album, Menart Records 2000), produced songs: "Čiča miča", "Čarobna frula" featuring General Woo, "Sex" featuring Target, "Dame biraju"
Vrućina Gradskog Asfalta (Tram 11 album, Menart Records 2001), produced songs: "Nisi Pazio", "Politiziranje" (featuring Prva petorka), "Crni dani", "Zlo i naopako", "A vi svi", "A vi svi RMX" featuring Prva petorka, Remi, Bizzo & La Bla, "Vrućina gradskog asfalta", "Jedno", "Jedno RMX" featuring KC Da Rookee, "Ti čašpri iskrivljeno" featuring Renman, "Eto šta ima", "Za 10 godina" featuring Ivana Husar, "Samizam" featuring Ink & Ivana Husar and "Ljubomora je kurva" featuring XL
Svaki pas ima svoj dan (El Bahattee album, Dallas Records 2001), produced the whole album
Od danas do sutra (Nered album, Menart Records 2001), produced songs: "Čuvari doline" featuring Remi
Takozvani (General Woo album, Menart Records 2002), produced the song "Nema veze" featuring Stu
Slušaj Mater (Edo Maajka album, Menart Records 2002): "Slušaj Mater", "Jesmo'l Sami?"
Stole (album, Stoka, Dino Dvornik, Nered, Jacques Houdek, Croatia Records 2003), produced the whole album
No Sikiriki (Edo Maajka album, Menart Records 2004): "Kliše", "Samo za raju" and "Dragi moj Vlado"
1,68 (Shorty album, Aquarius Records 2004): "Iza Mene", "Apel za mir" featuring Edo Maajka, "To je hip hop" and "Politika je kurva" featuring Saba
Baš je lijep ovaj svijet (General Woo & Nered album, Aquarius Records 2005), produced the song "Strogo povjerljivo" featuring Ivana Kindl
The Album ...nastavak (Target album, Menart Records 2005), produced the song "Ljubavni Problemi" featuring Ivana Kindl
Prvo Pa Muško (Connect album, Menart Records 2005), produced the song "Klade"; also co-produces 5 other songs on the album
Stig'o ćumur (Edo Maajka album, Menart Records 2006): "Uši zatvori", "To mora da je ljubav" featuring Remi, "To što se traži" featuring Dino Šaran and "Nikad Više"
Ovdje i Sada ( MC Popay album, Kingston Sound 2007): "Bashment danas", "Bum!", "Hrpa MC'ja" featuring Nightmare & Blunter, "To smo mi" featuring Edo Maajka
Povratak Cigana (Frenkie album, Menart Records 2007): "Povratak Cigana" featuring Hamza
Balkansko a naše (Edo Maajka album, Menart Records 2008) - produced the whole album.
Narodnjaci (Kandžija album, Dallas Records 2009): "Narodnjaci", "Intro", "Bic", "Nije Zadnja"
Sretan broj (Carla Belovari single, Dallas Records 2010): "Sretan Broj"
Chuck Norris Rap (Frenkie single, Menart Records 2010): "Chuck Norris Rap (Koolade remix)"
Koktel od rakije (Kandžija album, Dallas Records 2011): "Desno", "Smij se", "Polako", "Retoricka", "Kriza", "Mali mrznja", played bass on "Big Brother"
Štrajk Mozga (Edo Maajka album, Menart Records 2012): "Soma", "Drukčiji" feat. Marchello & Kandžija
Troyanac (Frenkie album, Menart Records 2012): "", "Gori", "Messi Rap" feat. Kontra, "Why You Want" feat. Vukašin
U cipelama moga oca (Priki album, Menart Records 2012), produced the song "Ovo Piće" feat. Koolade, co-produced the song "Punije žene"
"Zlatne Žbice" (Kandžija i Toxara album, 2012), Produced the song "Duge Kandže"
"Kronika Betona" (Flamie album, Street13 Records 2013), Produced the song "Kronika Betona" ft. Nemir, Bobi Vejn
"Zagreb Je Atlanta" (Geralt iz Rivije, EP 2015), Produced the song "U Getu"
"Head Nod (single)" (Geralt iz Rivije, 2015)
"Underground" (Nered i Stoka, single, Neki Daniels 2015)
Stani na put ft. Reksona, Frenkie, General Woo (Bassivity Digital/Red Bull 2015) theme song from the film "Stani na put" (MTV Adria/RedBull 2015)
Stani na put ft. Kontra, Marchello de Facto, Remi(Elemental) (Bassivity Digital/Red Bull 2015) theme song from the film "Stani na put" (MTV Adria/RedBull 2015)
Stani na put ft. Reksona, Frenkie, Remi, General Woo, Kontra, Marčelo, Baby Dooks, Gru (Bassivity Digital/Red Bull 2015) theme song from the film "Stani na put" (MTV Adria/RedBull 2015)
"No Pasaran (single)" (Edo Maajka, 2016)
"OJOJOJ (single)" (Edo Maajka, 2016)
"Od pješaka do rakete" (Burky x Geralt iz Rivije x Koolade, Bassivity Digital, 2016), produced the whole album
"Kune i Dinari (single)" (Geralt iz Rivije x Kendi, 2016)
"Čvarci od Marcipana EP" (Riđi Riđ (High5), 2017), produced songs "Dvajst do asa" and "Dado Pršo"
"Beton" (Kandžija, album, Universal Music 2018), produced songs "Ko te šta pito" and "Grah"
"Drugačiji" (Rens, EP, 2018), produced song "Male stvari" ft. Jasmin Jazz
"Na mom umu (Koolade Remix)" (Struka /Aristokrat Music, 2019)
"Obama" (single, Vojko V, ft. Z++ /Croatia Records 2020)
"Obama rmx" (single, Vojko V, Devito /Devito Anonymo 2020)
"Stanija" (single, Mlada Beba /Honey Money Gang 2021), co-produced the song with Mystee
"V.E.R.A." (single, Struka, Goldie, Shea, Koolade /Honey Money Gang 2021)
"Ledolomac" (EP, Vule Košmar, 2021), produced the whole EP
"Jedan i Jedan" (album, Tram 11 /Pad Sistema Records, 2022), produced songs "10 dana u ljubavi", "Pričamo", "Priče sa tamne strane", "Tvrda kopija", "Uhićen", "Tko nam je uzeo sjaj"
"Moćno" (album, Edo Maajka /Dallas Records, 2022), produced the whole album, except song "Svaki Čovjek (ft. Dino Šaran)", produced by Coby

International production credits

Disposable Arts (Masta Ace album, 2001): "Something's Wrong" (featuring Strick and Young Zee)
Nexcalibur (KC Da Rookee album, 2001): "Hot Souls", "You Asleep" and "Somethin' Different" featuring Aqeel
Born Wit' It" b/w Underdog (Strick 12 inch, Fat Beats, 2002): "Born Wit' It"
Relax Relate Release (El Da Sensei album, 2002): "On and On" (featuring Sadat X) and "So Think Again"
Truly Unique (Unspoken Heard 12 inch, 2002): "Truly Unique-Koolade Remix" and "Truly Unique-Remix Instrumental"
Mood Swing feat. Talib Kweli (Asheru 12 inch, 2002): "Soon Come-Koolade Remix" and "Soon Come-Remix Instrumental"
How We Do (Das Efx album, 2003): "Let's Get Money" and "B.S.A.P." (featuring Lovey)
Innere Sicherheit (Curse album, 2003): "Rap Gesetze 11-20"
1 Pied Dans L'biz (IPM album, 2003): "Mon Univers" and "Exode"
A Long Hot Summer (Masta Ace album, M3 2004): "Beautiful"
That One Way (Czarnok album, Capitol, 2005): "Pimp Tight"
More Fish (Ghostface Killah album, 2006): "Good" (featuring Trife da God, co-produced by P-Nut)
Don't Quit Your Day Job! (Consequence album, 2007): "Job Song" and "Disperse" (featuring Gangsta L. Crisis and Really Doe)
Eddy Meets Yannah - Remix EP (Eddy Meets Yannah EP, Compost 2007): "Losing Wings-Koolade Remix" featuring Capitol A
The Truth (Young Sid album, Move Te Crowd Records 2007), produced the song "Explosive" feat. David Dallas
Face Off (Bow Wow & Omarion album, 2007): "Hey Baby (Jump Off)"
The Show  (EMC album, 2008): "Who We Be"
Millionaire  (Izza Kizza single, Decon/Spuldiggaz 2008): "Millionaire"
Kizzaland (Izza Kizza album, Full Blast Music 2008): "Don't Stop Go", "Millionaire", "They're Everywhere", "Red Wine"
BAZAAR (Sunny Bizness ft. Bazaar, single, independent 2009)
The Wizard of Izz (Izza Kizza album, Full Blast Music 2009): "Don't Stop Go", "Connect The Dots" feat. Collin Munroe, "Set it off", "Red Wine"
They're Everywhere  (Izza Kizza single, Full Blast Music 2009): "They're Everywhere"
Connect The Dots  (Izza Kizza ep, Decon 2009): "Connect The Dots" featuring Collin Munroe and "Ooh La La (remix)"
This Is What It Feels Like  (Spinz album, Vibra Music 2009): "1 in a Million" featuring Koolade also available as a 12" single
What You Waiting For  (Mizz Nina featuring Colby O'Donnis album, Mizz Nina Productions/Warner Music Malaysia 2010): "What You Waiting For" featuring Colby O'Donnis
Hip Hop & Rap (Sunny Bizness ft. Vega, single, independent 2010)
Wer? (Sunny Bizznes ft. Nea & Tareq, single, independent 2010)
Take Over  (Mizz Nina featuring Flo Rida single, Mizz Nina Productions/Warner Music Malaysia 2011): "Take Over" featuring Flo Rida
Rapmusik (Sunny Bizness, album independent 2011) produced songs Hip Hop & Rap ft. Vega, Dieter Bohlen, Harz IV Blues, Bong Song, Heiss Heiss Baby, Hoer Mir Zu ft. Jonesmann
Excuse My Imagination (Leeloo Jammais album, Dallas 2011), produced the track "Rain Dance" feat. Koolade
Selling My Soul (Masta Killa album, 2012 Nature Sounds/Royal Lion), produced the track "What You See"
The Tonite Show  (EMC album, M3 Records 2008): "I Like You Like"
Barkie (MC DRT album, 2016), produced tracks "Brandschade" and "Woordkracht"
Hooikoorts EP (MC DRT, 2016), produced the track "Hooikoorts ft. Hilin Doyou"
Maylay Sparks ft. Last Emperor & Rucker Pawk - "Illadelph Elohim"
GR Team - "Daj mi pokoj!"
GR Team - "Pochop že..."
GR Team - "Zas títo"
XL (Sadat X x El Da Sensei, album, Vinyldigital.de 2018), produced song "Sign In" ft. AG (of Show & AG)
Compton's Most Wanted (Eiht & Chill) (Gangsta Bizness, album, Blue Samp Music 2019), produced songs "Classic Shit" ft. Weazel Loc, Daddy Rich, "I Swear" ft. Big2DaBoy, "Run Everythang" Ft. Tinigi Star, "Fucc Em"
Decko ft. Adela Ostroľudská - Veľký zoošit (Akupunktura, album, Ruka Hore, 2020)
Main Flow - Money Machine (single, Wannabattle Records 2021)
Durrand Bernarr - Homage (B-Boy Blues OST, DSING Records 2022)
Avehre - Something's Missing (B-Boy Blues OST, DSING Records 2022)

Remixed by Koolade...

Truly Unique (Koolade Remix) (Unspoken Heard 12 inch, 2002): "Truly Unique-Koolade Remix" and "Truly Unique-Remix Instrumental"
"Willy Overnight (Broke Niggaz) RMX" by Consequence (official 2004)
"Motivators (Koolade Remix)" by A Tribe Called Quest ft. Consequence (unofficial 2004)
"Romantika (Bloo Room Remix)" by Elemental (Menart 2004)
"Romantika (Koolade Remix)" by Elemental (Menart 2004)
"Mr. Slow Flow (Koolade Remix)" by Evidence (unofficial 2005)
"Losing Wings (Koolade Remix)" featuring Capitol A by Eddy Meets Yannah (Eddy Meets Yannah EP, Compost 2007): 
"Hypnotize You (Koolade Remix)" by N.E.R.D (unofficial 2010)
"Crabs (Koolade Remix)" by Respect Tha God ft. Smiff-N-Wessun (official 2011)
"Chuck Norris Rap (Koolade Remix)" by Frenkie (Menart 2011)
"Can We Be Friends (Can We Be Friends)" by CHUI (Dancing Bear 2014)
"Iembi Hipster" by Bvandzija / High5 / Koolade (Zlatne Zbice 2014)
"Meet The Frownies (Koolade Flip)", by Twin Sister (unofficial 2014)
"tryingNOT2 (Koolade Remix)" by BILK (official 2015)
"Let Em Know (Koolade Remix)" by Rasco (Threshold Recordings LLC / Diamond Media 360)
"Am I Wrong (Koolade Remix)" by Anderson Paak (unofficial 2016)
"Laputa (Koolade Rework)" by Hiatus Kaiyote (unofficial 2016)
"Over (Koolade Remix)" by Drake (unofficial 2017)
"Driven ft. Roc Marciano (Koolade Remix)" by JR & PH7 x St. Joe Louis (Below System Records, 2017)
"Link Up (Koolade Remix)" by NxWorries (unofficial 2018)
"Suede (Koolade Remix)" by NxWorries (unofficial 2018)
"Ye (Koolade Remix)" by Burna Boy (unofficial 2020)
"Location (Koolade Remix)" by Dave ft. Burna Boy (unofficial 2020)
"Never Call Me (Koolade Remix)" by Jhene Aiko (unofficial 2020)
"Slide (Koolade Remix)" by H.E.R. (unofficial 2020)
"Toast (Koolade Remix)" by Koffee (unofficial 2021)
"On and On" by Erykah Badu (unofficial 2021)

Featuring Koolade...

"Tepanje" by Tram 11 (demo album Workshop Class 11, 1997)
"Nema Skvadre" by Tram 11 feat. Major League Figures (album Covjece ne ljuti se, Menart 1999)
"Pocasna loza" by Sick Rhyme Sayazz aka Bolesna braca feat. Dash & Koolade (album Lovci Na Subare, Menart 2000)
"Ovaj ritam volim" by Edo Maajka (album Balkansko a nase, Menart 2008)
"FM Jam I Like" by Edo Maajka feat. Disciplinska komisija (album Balkansko a nase, Menart 2008)
"1 in a MIllion" by Spinz (album This Is What It Feels Like, Dallas 2009)
"Rain Dance" by Leeloo Jammais (album Excuse My Imagination, Dallas 2011)
"Ovo Piće" ft. Koolade, by Priki (album "U cipelama moga oca", Menart 2012)
"Pterodaktil", by Koolade & Kendi (album "Papirni avioni", Aristokrat Music 2017)
"Hamburg City Love" ft. Koolade N Cissalc, by Ben Bada Boom (album "The B-funk Story", Ninetofive Records 2019)
"Reach Out" ft. Koolade, by Ben Bada Boom (album "The B-funk Story", Ninetofive Records 2019)

Various artist compilation, film & theater placements and scores

"Mimoilazišta" (adaptation of the novel "Passing Places" by Stephen Greenhorn), theater play music score (Satiričko kazalište Kerempuh, 2001)
Phat Phillie & FRX present: Blackout 10 godina - The Best of Hip Hop (album, 2003), features songs: "Čiča miča - Bolesna Braća", "A vi svi - Tram 11, and "Svaki pas ima svoj dan - El Bahattee"
Speakin in Tongues (Stonegroove 2001) features track "Pocasna loza" by Sick Rhyme Sayazz feat. Dash & Koolade
Birthday Girl OST (Miramax/Film Four 2001) features track "Pocasna loza" by Sick Rhyme Sayazz feat. Dash & Koolade
Beats to the Rhyme (Play It Again Sam 2004) features track "Beautiful" by Koolade feat. Masta Ace
Hits You Missed, Vol.2 (M3 2005) features track "Survival" by Koolade feat. Masta Ace
Ugly Betty (TV series) features track "Hey Baby (Jump Off)" by Bow Wow and Omarion (Produced by Koolade)
So You Think You Can Dance (US) (TV talent show) features track "They're Everywhere" by Izza Kizza (Produced by Kooalde)
The Nicest - Indie Hip Hop, Vol.2 (Regulatin' Music 2012) features track Survival by Koolade feat. Masta Ace
The Nicest - Indie Hip Hop, Vol.5 (Regulatin' Music 2012) features track No More Music by Koolade feat. Styles P
10 Jahre Hip Hop Open Allstars (compiled by DJ Schowi) (0711 Entertainment/Four Artists/Warner Music Group 2012) features track Beautiful by Koolade feat. Masta Ace
Stani na put ft. Reksona, Frenkie, General Woo (Bassivity Digital/Red Bull 2015) theme song from the film "Stani na put" (MTV Adria/RedBull 2015)
Stani na put ft. Kontra, Marchello de Facto, Remi(Elemental) (Bassivity Digital/Red Bull 2015) theme song from the film "Stani na put" (MTV Adria/RedBull 2015)
Stani na put ft. Reksona, Frenkie, Remi, General Woo, Kontra, Marčelo, Baby Dooks, Gru (Bassivity Digital/Red Bull 2015) theme song from the film "Stani na put" (MTV Adria/RedBull 2015)
Cruisin' (various artist compilation), song "Moon Thug" (Blvnt Records 2016)
Collect Beats vol.3 (various artist compilation), song "Lone Jazz Sunday" (InchPerSecond Records 2016)
Feeding You New Knocks Vol.1 (various artist compilation), song "Phone Queue" (More Bounce Collective/Wicked Wax Records 2018)

Copywriting, marketing & media

"Simpa Ti & Ja" TV commercial music score, HT 1999
"Madden NFL 09", song placement, EA Sports 2009, Izza Kizza: "Millionaire"
"Ugly Betty" song placement, ABC 2008, Bow Wow & Omarion: "Hey Baby (Jump Off)"
"So You Think You Can Dance" song placement, FOX 2008, Izza Kizza: "They're Everywhere"
"H&M Kids Fashion Flash Mob" song placement, H&M 2009, Izza Kizza: "Set It Off"
"Y2K NBA Basketball 2009" song placement, Izza Kizza: "They're Everywhere"
"Mix It Up" web ad score/song placement, Alize 2009, Izza Kizza: "Mix It Up"
"Nice Ice" song placement, Nivea 2010, Buco aka Mali Dado: "Nice Ice"
Viceland (two placements, unreleased/unnamed beats)

References

External links 
 Official SoundCloud Page

Hip hop record producers
Living people
Musicians from Zagreb
Croatian hip hop musicians
1978 births